Children of Iron Gods (translit. Deti chugunnykh bogov) is a 1993 Russian-Hungarian drama film directed by Tamás Tóth. It was entered into the 18th Moscow International Film Festival.

Cast
Yevgeny Sidikhin as Ignat
Aleksander Kalyagin as Foreman
Yury Yakovlev as General
Nikolai Karnaukhov as Old man (as Nikolay Kornaukhov)
Mikhail Svetin as Fellow sponsor
Aleksandr Feklistov as Mityai
Mikhail Golubovich as Nasekin
Larisa Borodina as Raika
Yuri Slobodenyuk as Bekbulatka
Anatoli Mambetov as Bekbulatka's friend

References

External links

1993 films
1993 drama films
1990s Russian-language films
Hungarian drama films
Russian drama films
1990s Hungarian-language films